The Simon Sisters was a folk music sister duo consisting of Carly Simon and Lucy Simon.

They released three albums between 1964–1969 before Lucy left to get married. Lucy had a minor solo career and released two albums in the 1970s before finding greater success writing music for Broadway plays; she received a Tony Award nomination for her music on The Secret Garden in 1991.  Beginning in 1971, Carly began a very successful solo career, releasing over 23 studio albums that produced multiple Top 40 hits across the U.S. Billboard charts, as well as winning two Grammy Awards (from 14 nominations), a Golden Globe Award, and an Academy Award, among numerous other competitive and honorary accolades.

Background and history
The duo made their television debut performing on the Hootenanny series on April 27, 1963. Their repertoire consisted of folk music, peppered with a few original compositions. They were signed to Kapp Records that same year, and released their only albums with the record label: Meet the Simon Sisters (also released as "The Simon Sisters - Winkin' Blinkin' and Nod") and Cuddlebug. They had a minor hit with the single "Winkin' Blinkin' And Nod", a children's poem by Eugene Field that Lucy had put to music. It reached No. 73 on the Billboard Hot 100. They performed both "Winkin' Blinkin' And Nod" and "Turn! Turn! Turn!" on the Hootenanny TV series, and those performances ware selected for inclusion in the DVD set. In 1969, the duo was signed by Columbia Records and released a third album, The Simon Sisters Sing the Lobster Quadrille and Other Songs for Children, later re-released by Columbia in 1973 as Lucy & Carly – The Simon Sisters Sing for Children.

In 2006, Hip-O-Select re-released the albums Meet the Simon Sisters and Cuddlebug on CD as the single-disc "Winkin', Blinkin' and Nod: The Kapp Recordings". In 2008, Shout! Factory released the album The Simon Sisters Sing the Lobster Quadrille and Other Songs for Children on CD under the title Carly & Lucy Simon Sing Songs for Children.

Discography

Studio albums
 1964: Meet the Simon Sisters 
 1966: Cuddlebug
 1969: The Simon Sisters Sing the Lobster Quadrille and Other Songs for Children

Compilations and reissues
 1973: Lucy & Carly – The Simon Sisters Sing for Children 
 2006: Winkin', Blinkin' and Nod: The Kapp Recordings 
 2008: Carly & Lucy Simon Sing Songs for Children

References

External links

 Carly Simon's Official Website

Musical groups established in 1963
Musical groups disestablished in 1969
1963 establishments in Massachusetts
1969 disestablishments in Massachusetts
American women singers
Sibling musical duos
Carly Simon